In molecular biology, the term oligotyping may refer to multiple DNA sequence analysis methods.

 Oligotyping (taxonomy) may refer to a method of identifying organism taxonomy by primary DNA sequence
 Oligotyping (sequencing) may refer to a method of improving the accuracy of DNA sequencing